Hifazat (Safeguarding) is a 1987 Bollywood drama film directed by Prayag Raj. It stars Anil Kapoor, Madhuri Dixit in pivotal roles. The music of the film was composed by R. D. Burman. Later this movie remade in Telugu as Bobbili Raja.

Plot
After Laxmi has had three still-births, her husband, Satyaprakash and his mother are afraid she will not be able to give any more births, and therefore there will be no one to carry the name of the family forward. So they propose that Satyaprakash gets married for a second time, to which Laxmi consents to and as such he marries Rukmani. After this marriage Laxmi gets pregnant and gives birth to a son, Raj Kumar and shortly thereafter Rukmani too gives birth to a son, Lakhan. Raj Kumar is abducted and disappears from their lives. Thereafter, Satyaprakash is arrested for the murder of a contractor and sentenced to prison. Rukmani and her brother, Buddhiram, take over running the household and inflict abuse on Laxmi. Years later, a young man appears claiming to be the missing son of Laxmi and Satyaprakash, and he attempts to bring some sense and honor for poor Laxmi. But this does not last for long, when Satyaprakash is released from prison, he recognizes the young man, as his fellow prison inmate, and much to the shock and dismay of Laxmi, asks him to leave the house, little knowing that he has now thrown open the door for Buddhiram to kill him and Laxmi.

Cast

Ashok Kumar as Kailashnath
Nutan as Laxmi  
Anil Kapoor as Raj Kumar / Ram
Madhuri Dixit as Janki
Lalita Pawar 
Pran as Thakur Satyaprakash
Bindu as Rukmini
Kader Khan	as Buddhiram
Shakti Kapoor as Lakhan
Gulshan Grover as Gullu
Sharat Saxena as Shambhu Dada
Shubha Khote as Ganga  
Bharat Bhushan as Special Appearance In Song "Ram Ki Baaten Ram Hi Jaane"

Music
The songs were written by Anand Bakshi and music was given R. D. Burman.

External links
 

1987 films
1980s Hindi-language films
1987 drama films
Films scored by R. D. Burman
Indian drama films
Hindi-language drama films